WFBZ (105.5 FM, "105.5 ESPN") is a radio station broadcasting a sports format. Licensed to Trempealeau, Wisconsin, United States, the station serves the La Crosse area. The station is owned by Sparta-Tomah Broadcasting Co., Inc. and features programming from ESPN Radio.

History
The station was assigned the call letters WKDL on July 11, 1984. On October 1, 1986, the station changed its call sign to WKBH-FM, and on New Year's Day 1997, to the current WFBZ.

References

External links

FBZ
Sports radio stations in the United States